The Utica, Chenango and Susquehanna Valley Railway was formed in 1866 and came under the Delaware, Lackawanna and Western Railroad in 1870.

References

Defunct New York (state) railroads
Predecessors of the Delaware, Lackawanna and Western Railroad
Railway companies established in 1866
Railway companies disestablished in 1945
1866 establishments in the United States
American companies disestablished in 1945
American companies established in 1866